was a Japanese photographer.

Among his published works are the book Karada Kesho, with make-up artist Teruko Kobayashi. He was also responsible for the cover photography for the Steely Dan album Aja.

Fujii died on May 3, 2010, at the age of 75.

References

External links
Karada Kesho (contains biography of Fujii)
Hideki Fujii web museum 

Japanese photographers
1934 births
2010 deaths